Council for a Livable World is a Washington, D.C.-based non-profit advocacy organization dedicated to eliminating the U.S. arsenal of nuclear weapons. Its stated aim is for "progressive national security policies and helping elect congressional candidates who support them." The Council was founded in 1962 as the Council for Abolishing War by Hungarian nuclear physicist Leó Szilárd. Its research arm, the Center for Arms Control and Non-Proliferation, provides research to members of Congress and their staff. In February, 2016, John F. Tierney was appointed the executive director of the Council for a Livable World and the Center for Arms Control and Non-Proliferation, the council’s affiliated education and research organization. For more than 50 years, the Council for a Livable World has been advocating for a more principled approach to U.S. national security and foreign policy.

Policy influence and lobbying
Every election cycle, the Council endorses congressional candidates who are arms control advocates and who support the Council's outlook on national security issues. Since its inception, the Council has helped elect 134 U.S. arms control advocates to the Senate and 226 to the House of Representatives. Council supporters raised over $1.6 million in 2014. Candidates seeking endorsements are required to answer questionnaires on issues and to defend their positions in interviews. The Council endorses candidates for the House of Representatives through PeacePAC. The Council endorsed Presidents Barack Obama and Joe Biden in their respective first runs for U.S. Senate seats.

The Council has influenced U.S. arms control and national security policies for over fifty years by working on or supporting several issues including:

 Rallying support on Capitol Hill in favor of the Iran nuclear deal
 Ratifying the Chemical Weapons Convention and Intermediate-Range Nuclear Forces Treaty, Conventional Forces in Europe, Strategic Arms Reduction Treaty (START)  and the New Strategic Arms Reduction Treaty (New START) 
 Establishing a U.S. nuclear testing moratorium in 1992
 Banning biological weapons and terminating chemical weapons programs 
 Limiting the deployment of the MX missile and B-2 bomber
 Blocking deployment of National Missile Defense by the Clinton administration
 Eliminating funding for the nuclear "Bunker Buster" and "Reliable Replacement Warhead," two new generations of nuclear weapons

Father Robert F. Drinan National Peace and Human Rights Award

Since 2006, Council for a Livable World and its research center and sister organization, Center for Arms Control and Non-Proliferation, present the Father Robert F. Drinan National Peace and Human Rights Award to individuals who exemplify the late Father Drinan's commitment to peace and human justice.  The award broadly focuses on U.S. politics, political science, physical science, biology, peace studies, and peace and human rights activism.

Officers
Robert K. Musil, Chair
Jules Zacher, Vice-Chair
Timothy L. Brennan, Secretary
Lorin Walker, Treasurer

Board of directors
Aron Bernstein, Professor of Physics Emeritus, Massachusetts Institute of Technology
Paul Castleman, Business Executive 
Alice T. Day, Sociologist 
Laurie Dewey, Activist; Philanthropist 
Katherine Magraw, Foundation Consultant 
Gene Pokorny, Consultant 
Philip G. Schrag, Professor of Law, Georgetown University
Dr. James Walsh, Research Associate, Massachusetts Institute of Technology’s Security Studies Program (SSP)
Daniel Wirls, Professor, Merrill College, University of California
Lt. General Robert Gard (ret. USA) PhD, Chairman of the Board, Center for Arms Control and Non-Proliferation
 Nicholas Clark, Business executive, and adjunct professor

National advisory board
Margaret Gage, President and Executive Director, Proteus Fund
Sen. Gary Hart, Former U.S. Senator
Lawrence Hess, Businessman
John Isaacs, Senior Fellow
General John H. Johns, retired brigadier general
Colonel Richard Klass, U.S Air Force (ret.)
Priscilla Johnson McMillan, Associate, Davis Center for Russian and Eurasian Studies, Harvard University
Matthew Meselson, Professor, Natural Sciences, Harvard University
Richard Schiff, Actor

Staff
The Honorable John Tierney, Executive Director, Former Member of Congress (1997-2015)
John Isaacs, Senior Fellow
Cain Farmer, Controller
Khalil Cutair, Staff Accountant

See also
 List of anti-war organizations

References

External links
 Council for a Livable World website
Chain Reaction, the Council's blog
Center for Arms Control and Non-Proliferation website The Council's research organization

Anti–nuclear weapons movement
Peace organizations based in the United States
Organizations established in 1962
1962 establishments in Washington, D.C.